Heliocopris hamadryas is a species of beetles of the family Scarabaeidae.

Description
The body is glossy and the coloration varies from dark brown to black. These beetles form balls with dung, into which females lay eggs. Larvae feed and pupate within the dung balls and emerge as adult beetles.

Distribution
This species occurs in Angola, Democratic Republic of Congo, Kenya, Malawi, Mozambique, Rwanda, Somalia, Tanzania, Uganda, Zambia, Zimbabwe

References
 Biolib
 Svatopluk Pokorn, J. Zidek, Karl Werner  Giant dung-beetles of the genus Heliocopris

External links
 Glasgow museum

hamadryas
Beetles described in 1775
Taxa named by Johan Christian Fabricius